Göschenen (German) a village and municipality in the canton of Uri in Switzerland. It sits at the northern end of the Gotthard tunnel. The Göschenen riots (1875) saw Urner troops opening fire on Italian miners demonstrating for better working conditions and wages on the tunnel's construction site.

Name
Göschenen is first mentioned in 1280 as Gesschenden. The name is from Rumantsch *cascina (modern caschigna) "alpine hut", from Latin capsum "corral", but influenced by the word for cheese, cascio. The e in the first syllable is due to Germanic i-umlaut, changed to ö in modern spelling is a hypercorrection based on the phonology of the dialect of Uri.

Geography

Of this area, 7.3% is used for agricultural purposes, while 11.4% is forested. Of the rest of the land, 0.9% is settled (buildings or roads) and the remainder (80.4%) is non-productive (rivers, glaciers or mountains). , 5.1% of the total land area was heavily forested, while 5.5% is covered in small trees and shrubbery. Of the agricultural land, 0.0% is used for farming or pastures, while 0.7% is used for orchards or vine crops and 6.6% is used for alpine pastures. Of the settled areas, 0.1% is covered with buildings, 0.3% is classed as special developments, and 0.5% is transportation infrastructure. Of the unproductive areas, 1.3% is unproductive standing water (ponds or lakes), 0.9% is unproductive flowing water (rivers), 62.8% is too rocky for vegetation, and 15.4% is other unproductive land.

Göschenen and its railway station are located at the northern end of the Gotthard Road Tunnel and the Gotthard Rail Tunnel. The village grew up around a bridge over the Reuss. The Schöllenen Gorge in the Reuss Valley between Andermatt and Göschenen is the location of the infamous Devil's Bridge. A very short  railway line, the Schöllenenbahn, connects Göschenen railway station with Andermatt railway station, via the Schöllenen Gorge.

Until 1875 it was part of the municipality of Wassen. It consists of the village of Göschenen and the hamlets of Abfrutt and the Göscheneralp.

Demographics

, 4.2% of the population was made up of foreign nationals. Over the last 10 years the population has decreased at a rate of -26.9%. Most of the population speaks German (94.9%), with Portuguese being second most common ( 2.0%) and Spanish being third ( 1.2%).  the gender distribution of the population was 49.3% male and 50.7% female.

In the 2007 federal election the FDP party received 90.4% of the vote.

The entire Swiss population is generally well educated. In Göschenen about 58.4% of the population (between age 25-64) have completed either non-mandatory upper secondary education or additional higher education (either university or a Fachhochschule).

Göschenen has an unemployment rate of 0.81%. , there were 34 people employed in the primary economic sector and about 10 businesses involved in this sector. 75 people are employed in the secondary sector and there are 4 businesses in this sector. 96 people are employed in the tertiary sector, with 17 businesses in this sector.

The historical population is given in the following table:

 Population increase due to construction of the Gotthard rail tunnel.

Weather
Göschenen has an average of 151.4 days of rain per year and on average receives  of precipitation. During this month there is precipitation for an average of 14.2 days. The month with the most days of precipitation is May, with an average of 15.3, but with only  of precipitation.

References

External links 

 
 
 Wages Switzerland

Municipalities of the canton of Uri